The moonshine shrew (Crocidura luna) is a species of mammal in the family Soricidae. It is found in Angola, Burundi, Democratic Republic of the Congo, Kenya, Malawi, Mozambique, Rwanda, Tanzania, Uganda, Zambia, and Zimbabwe. Its natural habitat is subtropical or tropical moist montane forests.

References
 Hutterer, R. 2004.  Crocidura luna.   2006 IUCN Red List of Threatened Species.   Downloaded on 30 July 2007.

Crocidura
Mammals described in 1910
Taxonomy articles created by Polbot